Plas Teg is a Grade I listed Jacobean house in Wales. It is near the village of Pontblyddyn, Flintshire between Wrexham and Mold. It is considered to be one of the finest examples of Jacobean architecture in Wales, and the finest in North Wales.

History 

The house was built by Sir John Trevor I, a prominent courtier of King James I, in about 1610. Sir John died in 1629 and his wife in 1643, leaving the house unoccupied as the English Civil War broke out. It was twice raided by the Roundheads, but continued to be passed down to Trevor descendants until the early 20th century. During the Second World War the house was requisitioned by the War Office to billet soldiers. In 1945, it was sold to an auctioneers company, which used it for storage. 

By the early 1950s, Plas Teg was in a state of advanced decay and under threat of demolition. Following a public outcry, the derelict house received a Grade I listing from Cadw, protecting it from demolition. A Trevor descendant, Patrick Trevor-Roper, purchased the house and partially restored it with funds from the Historic Buildings Council. He then leased out the house until 1977, when Mr and Mrs William Llewelyn bought the house. The couple only used parts of the ground floor but the rest of the house became little more than a ruin.

Current ownership
In 1986 Cornelia Bayley acquired Plas Teg for £75,000. She carried out a series of works at a cost of £400,000, £199,000 of which was funded by Cadw. Ten months after purchase the house was opened to the public. It remains Bayley's private residence. Plas Teg in 2022 closed to the public pending repairs.

The county of Flintshire is said to be a land of spirits and hauntings. One notable case is that of the grey lady, described as the most popular of such entities in North East Wales. The old woman is reported to have been seen moving across the A541 adjacent to Plas Teg into the path of traffic.

The courtyard entrance, walled garden, shrubberies and avenue are listed as Grade II in the Cadw/ICOMOS Register of Parks and Gardens of Special Historic Interest in Wales.

In media 
Paranormal enthusiasts claim Plas Teg is one of the "most haunted" houses in Wales and it has featured on ITV's Extreme Ghost Stories, Living's Most Haunted programme and in Ghosthunting With... Girls Aloud in 2006.

On 4 March 2010 Plas Teg was the subject of a Channel 4 television programme presented by hotelier Ruth Watson as part of her Country House Rescue series. In 2015  the house was shown as a feature in the Channel 4 series Obsessive Compulsive Cleaners. In 2019 the house featured in Hidden Wales with Will Millard.

References

Further reading 
A book detailing the history of Plas Teg and the Trevor family was published in 2006. The expanded second edition tackles the theories regarding Judge Jeffreys.
 Mark Baker, Plas Teg – A Jacobean Country House. Mold: 2006.

External links
Plas Teg – official website
Book by Mark Baker on Plas Teg on Country House Biographies
BBC Wales – ghosts of Plas Teg
BBC Wales – video tour of Plas Teg
BBC Wales – photos of Plas Teg

Clwyd
Grade I listed buildings in Flintshire
Reportedly haunted locations in Wales
Grade I listed houses
Country houses in Wales
Registered historic parks and gardens in Flintshire